, known in the overseas market as Amazon Riders,  is a 2016 Japanese tokusatsu web drama. It is a darker and more mature reimagining of the 1974 television series. Kamen Rider Amazon, and part of Toei's Super Hero Year, celebrating the 45th anniversary of the Kamen Rider Series (and the 40th series of Super Sentai). Amazon Riders was originally exclusively released through Amazon Video in Japan starting April 1, 2016. It was also broadcast on television on BS Asahi (TV Asahi's broadcast satellite channel) starting July 3, 2016, and Tokyo MX starting July 6, 2016. In a similar vein as the reboot films based on the Shōwa era series, Kamen Rider: The First & Kamen Rider: The Next, Kamen Rider Amazons takes place in an alternate universe separate from the main series timeline.

The second season was announced on May 31, 2016, that it will be released in spring 2017 on Amazon Prime. The second season is titled  and was exclusively released through Amazon Video in Japan starting April 7, 2017.

Plans to release season one in international markets such as the United States, the United Kingdom, and Germany were announced in 2016. An English subtitled version of the first season launched on Amazon Prime on April 19, 2018 with Season 2 launching on September 21, 2018.

Story

Later, Jun Maehara, a member of Nozama Peston Service who died once during an Amazons attacks, is revived into Amazon Sigma.

Taking place five years after the first season, Season 2 focuses on a new protagonist named Chihiro, a lone boy raised by Amazons who hates them but must suppress his cannibalistic urges and can transform into Amazon Neo, and is soon revealed to be the son of Jin Takayama. The original protagonist Haruka would later acquire an upgraded form known as Amazon New Omega.

Episodes
A unique feature of the series is that the episode titles are given in alphabetical order.

Kamen Rider Amazons (Amazon Riders)

Kamen Rider Amazons 2 (Amazon Riders 2)

Films

Ultra Super Hero Taisen
A crossover film, titled  featuring the casts of Kamen Rider Ex-Aid, Amazon Riders, Uchu Sentai Kyuranger, and Doubutsu Sentai Zyuohger, was released in Japan on March 25, 2017. This movie also celebrates the 10th anniversary of Kamen Rider Den-O and features the spaceship Andor Genesis from the Xevious game, which is used by the movie's main antagonists, as well as introduces the movie-exclusive Kamen Rider True Brave, played by Kamen Rider Brave's actor Toshiki Seto from Kamen Rider Ex-Aid, and the villain Shocker Great Leader III, played by the singer Diamond Yukai. In addition, individual actors from older Kamen Rider and Super Sentai TV series, Ryohei Odai (Kamen Rider Ryuki), Gaku Matsumoto (Shuriken Sentai Ninninger), Atsushi Maruyama (Zyuden Sentai Kyoryuger), and Hiroya Matsumoto (Tokumei Sentai Go-Busters) reprise their respective roles.

Season 1 - Awakening
A re-edited version of Kamen Rider Amazons, titled , was released in Japan on May 5, 2018.

Season 2 - Reincarnation
A re-edited version of Kamen Rider Amazons Season 2, titled , was released in Japan on May 12, 2018.

The Last Judgement

A sequel film titled  , which is set after the end of the second season and concludes the storyline, was released in Japan on May 19, 2018.

Manga
, written by Shinjiro and supervised by Yasuko Kobayashi, is a manga adaptation that is a side story focusing on the Firefly Amazon, one of the Experiment Amazons. It takes place between the first and second seasons of Kamen Rider Amazons.

Cast
 : 
 : 
 : 
 : 
 : 
 : 
 : 
 : 
 : 
 : 
 : 
 : 
 : 
Season 1 exclusively
 : 
 : 
Season 2 exclusively
 : 
 : 
 : 
 : 
 : 
 : 
 : 
 :

Guest cast

Season 1
 : 
 : 
 : 
 : 
 : 
Season 2
 :

Theme songs
 "Armour Zone"
 Lyrics: 
 Composition: 
 Arrangement: 
 Artist: 
 The theme song of the first season. This song is also used as the opening theme song for the television broadcast version of the series.
 "DIE SET DOWN"
 Lyrics: Mike Sugiyama
 Composition: Nobuo Yamada
 Arrangement: Tetsuya Takahashi
 Artist: Taro Kobayashi
 The theme song of the second season.

References

External links
  (Season 1)
  (Season 2)
  (Season 1) at Toei Company
  (Season 2) at Toei Company

Amazons
2016 Japanese television series debuts
Amazon Prime Video original programming
Biopunk television series
Cannibalism in fiction
Horror drama
Japanese horror fiction television series
Television series about viral outbreaks
Television series reboots
Television series set in 2016
Television series set in the 2020s
Television shows written by Yasuko Kobayashi